Edwin Moles (December 13, 1908 – July 16, 1969) was an American swimmer. He competed in the men's 200 metre breaststroke at the 1932 Summer Olympics.

References

1908 births
1969 deaths
American male swimmers
Olympic swimmers of the United States
Swimmers at the 1932 Summer Olympics
Sportspeople from Minneapolis